Sulcaria is a genus of three species of fruticose lichens in the family Parmeliaceae. Sulcaria was circumscribed by lichenologist Jan Bystrek in 1971.

References

Parmeliaceae
Lichen genera
Lecanorales genera
Taxa described in 1971